The Malyuk, also known as Vulcan or Vulcan-M, is an assault rifle developed by the Ukrainian arms company Interproinvest (IPI). 

The Malyuk is a development of the Soviet Kalashnikov assault rifle, reconfigured into a bullpup layout.

History
According to IPI Vice CEO Serhiy Luhovskoy, development of the Malyuk started in 2005. It was based on an earlier attempt for a bullpup rifle known as the Vepr and the mistakes made with it. The development was based on a contract placed by the Security Service of Ukraine with prototype rifles provided before inquiries were made by the Ukrainian Ministry of Defence in 2008. In February 2015, feedback was provided by then president Petro Poroshenko and the Department of State Security Guard. Production was made in cooperation with the Electron Corporation as they can quickly produce the rifles with modern manufacturing equipment with the Krasyliv Assembly Manufacturing Plant.

The Malyuk debuted in 2015 at the Arms & Security Expo in Kyiv in 2015. The rifle was first seen in public outside of Ukraine at the International Defence Industry Fair in May 2015 at Istanbul, Turkey and at the Azerbaijan International Defence Exhibition in September 2016 at Baku, Azerbaijan.

In 2016, it was known that 200 Malyuks were delivered to the Ukrainian Army. Limited trials were conducted on the Malyuk with the Ukrainian Army in the same year.

The Malyuk has been used in the 2022 Russian invasion of Ukraine by Ukrainian's special forces units; the National Guard of Ukraine, including the Azov Battalion; and the Ukrainian Territorial Defense Forces. The Rapid Operational Response Unit has been reportedly using it in the war.

On February 27, 2022, an alleged saboteur was arrested in Odesa by the State Border Guard Service and the National Police of Ukraine in a joint operation. Among the items confiscated included a loaded Malyuk rifle with a Makarov PM, an RPG-22 and two T-62M anti-tank mines.

The weapon has been demonstrated in Indonesia and Sri Lanka for potential contracts.

Design

The Malyuk is made from polymer materials and is chambered in 7.62x39mm,  5.45×39mm and 5.56×45mm NATO ammo and has an AK-74-type flash hider. Malyuks chambered in 7.62x39mm and 5.45x39mm use AK-47/AKM/RPK and AK-74-based magazines while those chambered in 5.56x45mm NATO use AK-100-based magazines.

It can be equipped with an IPI-made suppressor as required. The Malyuk is cooled by air convection, which allows the rifle to have a longer barrel life. 

The rifle's effective firing range is 500 m at a rate of 700 rounds/minute. The magazine release button is located next to the trigger. As the magazine well is specifically designed to facilitate better loading, it allows the magazine to drop by itself. To solve the problem of excessive gas emissions, a deflector shield is placed over the ejection port. This allows spent cartridge cases to fall alternatively between 45 degrees or downward while reduced gas is sent to the receiver.

Recoil is reduced by 50% and the design allows the user to fire the rifle, unload and load the magazine with one hand. The Malyuk can either retain the AKM-based selective fire or an ambidextrous low-profile two-position selector for semi and full auto fire. The upper receiver has a full-length Picatinny rail with 3 short Picatinny rails on the handguard.

The Malyuk can be equipped with a RSP2W Shoot Corner for the user to fire it from around a corner. It is possible to mount an underbarrel grenade launcher.

Left or right-handed shooters can easily use the Malyuk as it is ambidextrous.

A commercial version of the Malyuk was developed at the Krasyliv Assembly Manufacturing Plant in cooperation with Electron Corporation.

Variants

 Malyuk K-01/02 - Semi-automatic civilian variant. The K-01 variant is chambered in 7.62x39 and the K-02 variant is chambered in 5.56x45
 Shepit - Meaning "whisper" in Ukrainian; Malyuk built with a long barrel, bipod, and suppressor
 Riff - Man-portable anti-drone weapon powered by a 100-watt portable battery

References

Bibliography

External links
 About Vulcan page on Interproinvest website

Kalashnikov derivatives
Rifles of Ukraine
Bullpup rifles